The Keystone K-55 Pronto was a mail plane developed in the United States in the late 1920s.

Design and development
The Pronto was a conventional single-bay, unequal-span biplane design with slightly staggered wings. The pilot sat in an open cockpit, in tandem with a second cockpit that could carry two passengers side-by-side. The fixed, tailskid undercarriage had divided main units.

A number of these aircraft were purchased by the government of Peru. Operated by the aviation arm of the Peruvian Navy, these aircraft initiated the first airmail service into the Peruvian Amazon. The first flight of this service was made by two Prontos, piloted by Leonardo Alvariño Herr and Harold B. Grow from Lima to San Ramón on 26 October 1927.

At least one Peruvian Pronto was fitted with pontoons and used to survey the Amazon River for locations suitable for seaplane operations.

In the Colombia-Peru War one Peruvian K-55 flown by Lieutenant Suero was captured by the Colombian Army.

Operators

Peruvian Navy

Specifications

References

Further reading

External links

 aerofiles.com

1920s United States mailplanes
Pronto
Biplanes
Aircraft first flown in 1927